Regine Live: Songbird Sing the Classics is the first live album of singer-actress Regine Velasquez-Alcasid. It was released in 2000 in the Philippines, under Viva Records. The album was certified 6× platinum by PRIMA, denoting shipments of 200,000+ copies sold in Philippines.

This album was recorded live from Velasquez's concert "Songbird Sings the Classics" at The Westin Philippine Plaza on October 6, 2000.

Critical reception

In a review of the album, David Gonzales of AllMusic wrote: "Velasquez's voice is difficult to hear on the beginning of "Autumn Leaves", a problem which plagues other songs here, including "Sometime Somewhere", "If You Go Away", "What Are You Doing the Rest of Your Life", and "Run to You", among others. She sings in a very high, thin register in the beginning of many songs, and this probably contributes to the problem, but the technical mixing could have been better, too."

Track listing

1 ("Moon River", "Two for the Road", "Moment to Moment")
2 ("Ngayon at Kailanman", "Iduyan Mo", "Kailan", "Hangggang sa Dulo ng Walang Hanggan", "Kastilyong Buhangin")
3 ("Could It Be Magic", "Weekend in New England", "Even Now", "If I Should Love Again")

Musicians
Gerard Salonga – conductor, piano
Rica Arambulo – synthesizer
Cesar Aguas – guitars (acoustic)
Nino Regalado – drums
Roger Herrera – guitars (electric), bass
Benjie Bautista – violins
DJ Francisco – violins
Gonzalo Estrada – violins
Bernadette Cardoniga – violins
Jeremy Dadap – violins
Rochel Lorenzo – violas
Cecilia Obtinaro – violas
Ed Pasamba – cellos
Tina Pasamba – cellos

See also
Regine Velasquez discography
List of best-selling albums in the Philippines

References

External links
 "Top 20 Biggest-selling albums in the Philippines". timeoutbahrain.com retrieved 2010-01-02

Regine Velasquez albums
2000 live albums